Graeme Anderson is the name of:

Graeme Anderson (footballer, born 1939) (1939–2022), Australian rules footballer with Carlton
Graeme Anderson (footballer, born 1953) (born 1953), Australian rules footballer with Collingwood

See also
Graham Anderson (1929–2012), Canadian scholar